Katchem Kate is a 1912 extant comedic silent film directed by Mack Sennett and starring Mabel Normand. The film was based on Dell Anderson's story "Cunning Kate."

The film was filmed in Los Angeles.

Plot

Cast 

 Mabel Normand as Katchem Kate
 Fred Mace as Detective Agency Head
 Sylvia Ashton as Kate's supervisor
 Frank Opperman as customer / anarchist
 Charles Avery
 Edward Dillon
 Jack Pickford

References 

1912 films
Films shot in Los Angeles
Films directed by Mack Sennett